Edward James MacQueen (born December 28, 1935) was a Canadian professional hockey player who played 840 games in the American Hockey League for the Cleveland Barons, Providence Reds, and Baltimore Clippers. He also played for the Vancouver Canucks in the Western Hockey League, and for the Quebec Aces in the Quebec Hockey League.

External links
 

1935 births
Living people
Vancouver Canucks (WHL) players
People from Glace Bay
Ice hockey people from Nova Scotia
Cleveland Barons (1937–1973) players
Providence Reds players
Baltimore Clippers players
Quebec Aces (QSHL) players
Canadian ice hockey defencemen